Federal Highway 107 (Carretera Federal 107) is a Federal Highway of Mexico. The highway travels from Mexican Federal Highway 101 at Jiménez, Tamaulipas in the north to Mexican Federal Highway 180 north of Soto la Marina, Tamaulipas in the south. Federal Highway 107 is co-signed with Tamaulipas Highway 38.

References

107